The Joseph P. Kennedy Jr. Foundation (JPKF) is a non-profit foundation founded by Ambassador Joseph P. Kennedy Sr. in 1946 in memory of his son Joseph P. Kennedy Jr. The foundation was led by his youngest brother, U.S. Senator Edward M. Kennedy, until his death in 2009. The foundation funded the construction of the Joseph P. Kennedy Jr. Memorial Hall at Boston College, now a part of Campion Hall and home to the college's Lynch School of Education. The foundation had assets in 2000 of $30 million (equivalent to $ million in ).

References

External links
 Joseph P. Kennedy Jr. Foundation

Kennedy family
Charities based in Massachusetts
Organizations based in Boston
Organizations established in 1946
1946 establishments in the United States